Peter Lavorato (born August 26, 1952 in Edmonton, Alberta) is a former professional Canadian football player who played in the Canadian Football League for ten years. Lavorato played defensive back for the Edmonton Eskimos, BC Lions and Montreal Concordes from 1975 to 1984. He was part of five Grey Cup-winning teams for the Eskimos. Lavorato was an All-Star in 1977. He was a theatre arts major and played college football at Utah State University. He acted in professional theatre during his football career.

From 2003 to 2017, Lavorato coached football and taught English and Drama at Sacred Heart School in Atherton, California. He led the varsity football team to win five  Central Coast Section (CCS) titles. In 2017, Lavorato took over as head coach at The King’s Academy in Sunnyvale, California. In his second year he guided the varsity team to their first CCS title in football. Lavorato previously taught in Alberta and served as the Edmonton Eskimos' Defensive Line Coach in 1995.

References

1952 births
Living people
BC Lions players
Canadian football defensive backs
Edmonton Elks coaches
Edmonton Elks players
Montreal Concordes players
Players of Canadian football from Alberta
Canadian football people from Edmonton
Utah State Aggies football players
Canadian players of American football